Lin Qiang may refer to:

Lin Qiang (footballer) (born 1960), Chinese footballer
Lin Qiang (politician) (born 1969), Chinese politician
Lim Giong (born 1964), Taiwanese musician and actor